"" is the official anthem of the Italian region of Aosta Valley. Music and lyrics were originally written by French composer Alfred Roland in 1832, and the original title of the song was "", or "". Lyrics were later adapted for the Aosta Valley by poet and composer Flaminie Porté, while the music was adapted by Teresio Colombotto. It was officially recognized as the regional anthem in 2006.

Lyrics

References

Aosta Valley
Regional songs
1832 compositions
Italian anthems